Nurjahan Begum (4 June 1925 – 23 May 2016) was the first female journalist in Bangladesh and a trailblazer for female journalists in South Asia. Begum was awarded Ekushey Padak in 2011 by the Government of Bangladesh. She served as the editor of Begum magazine.

Career
Begum was the daughter of Mohammad Nasiruddin, journalist and founder of Saogat and Begum magazines. Upon Begum Rokeya's request, she was admitted to Sakhawat Memorial School at Baby Class.

The first issue of Begum magazine was published on 20 July 1947. For the first four months, Nurjahan worked as the acting editor of the magazine helping the editor poet Begum Sufia Kamal with collecting, editing and selecting writings for the issues.

Personal life
Begum was married to Rokanuzzaman Khan. Together they had two daughters, Flora Nasreen Khan and Rina Yasmin. Her granddaughter Priota Iftekhar made a documentary film on her 91st birth anniversary, titled “Nurjahan Begum – Itihaaser Kingbadanti Nari.”

Awards
 2011, Ekushey Padak
 Bengali year 1409, Anannya Literature Award

References

1925 births
2016 deaths
People from Chandpur District
Bangladeshi women journalists
Recipients of the Ekushey Padak
Honorary Fellows of Bangla Academy
Recipients of Begum Rokeya Padak
21st-century Bangladeshi women politicians
Women members of the Jatiya Sangsad